Xylosma grossecrenata is a species of flowering plant in the family Salicaceae. It is endemic to New Caledonia.

References

grossecrenata
Endemic flora of New Caledonia
Critically endangered plants
Taxonomy articles created by Polbot
Taxa named by Hermann Otto Sleumer